This list of tallest buildings in Florida ranks the tallest buildings ( or higher) in the U.S. state of Florida by height. The tallest building in the state is the 85-story Panorama Tower, which rises  in the City of Miami's Brickell neighborhood and was completed in 2017.

The majority are located in the City of Miami, and over 94% are in the Greater Miami area while the rest are in the Tampa and Jacksonville areas. None of them are in the Orlando area. Of the 37 tallest buildings in Florida, 24 are in the City of Miami, 8 in Sunny Isles Beach, 2 are in Miami Beach, 2 are in Tampa, and 1 is in Jacksonville. The Greater Miami area accounts for 34 of the 37 tallest buildings over 550 feet in Florida. Miami alone is ranked as the third largest skyline in the United States after New York City and Chicago, even without counting the extended skyline up the beach to Sunny Isles and Fort Lauderdale. 
 
The majority of the skyscrapers in Miami are within the Greater Downtown Miami area, specifically the neighborhoods of the Central Business District (including the Downtown Miami Historic District), Arts & Entertainment District, Brickell, and Edgewater. Thomas Kramer is well known for the negotiations with local Miami-Dade County governments that allowed the building of the tallest towers in Miami. His influence is evident in the construction of high-rises in Miami Beach, particularly in the South Beach neighborhood of "South of Fifth".

Tallest buildings
This list ranks the tallest buildings in Florida that stand at least 550 ft (or 167m) tall, based on standard height measurement. This includes spires and architectural details but does not include antenna masts. An equals sign (=) following a rank indicates the same height between two or more buildings. The "Year" column indicates the year in which a building was completed or topped-out. Where applicable, floor counts are given by the observed measurements, as reported floor counts may include many skipped floors, not limited to floor 13.

Timeline of tallest buildings
This is a list of buildings that were the tallest in Florida when they were built, beginning in the early 20th century, when the skyscraper boom began in the state. Since 1902, six of Florida's tallest buildings have been in Jacksonville, five have been in Miami, two have been in Tampa, and one in Pensacola.

See also
 List of tallest buildings in Fort Lauderdale
 List of tallest buildings in Jacksonville
 List of tallest buildings in Miami
 List of tallest buildings in Miami Beach
 List of tallest buildings in Orlando
 List of tallest buildings in Sunny Isles Beach
 List of tallest buildings in St. Petersburg
 List of tallest buildings in Tallahassee
 List of tallest buildings in Tampa

References

Tallest
 
Florida